Southampton Shoal is a former lighthouse site in California, United States.  A platform sits at the southwest edge of Southampton Shoals, northeast of Angel Island in the San Francisco Bay.  The platform is all that remains of the original structure and supports an automated bell which chimes every ten seconds and red light mounted on a pole, which flashes on for three seconds and is then dark for 3 seconds in each six second cycle (Iso R 6s).

History

Southampton Shoal Lighthouse was a square building built on a platform supported by wooden piers.  It was built and first lit in 1905 with a fifth order Fresnel lens. The original lens is on display at the Angel Island Interpretive Center.

In 1960, the structure was moved to Tinsley Island  which is a private island in the San Joaquin River delta close to Stockton.  The island is owned by the St. Francis Yacht Club of San Francisco.  The building is now in use for lodging.

See also

 List of lighthouses in the United States

References

Sources

 ID COMDTPUB P16502.6

External links

 Picture of the active Light

Lighthouses completed in 1905
Houses completed in 1905
Lighthouses in the San Francisco Bay Area
Transportation buildings and structures in San Joaquin County, California
1905 establishments in California